Fornace (Fornàs in local dialect) is a comune (municipality) in Trentino in the northern Italian region Trentino-Alto Adige/Südtirol, located about  northeast of Trento.

Fornace borders the following municipalities: Lona-Lases, Baselga di Pinè, Albiano, Civezzano and Pergine Valsugana.

Demographic evolution

References

Cities and towns in Trentino-Alto Adige/Südtirol